Piptatherum coerulescens is a species of perennial grass in the family Poaceae (true grasses). They have a self-supporting growth form.

Sources

References 

Pooideae
Flora of Malta